Ambinanindrano is the name of several municipalities in Madagascar:

Ambinanindrano, Ambositra - a municipality in Amoron'i Mania
Ambinanindrano - a municipality in Mahanoro District, in Atsinanana